Marc Spautz (born 10 April 1963, in Esch-sur-Alzette) is a Luxembourgian politician.  He is a member of the Christian Social People's Party (CSV), sitting in the national legislature, the Chamber of Deputies, and the communal council of Schifflange.

He is the son of Jean Spautz, a fellow CSV deputy and trade union leader, and a former President of the Chamber.  Marc followed in his father's footsteps, becoming a member of the CSV in 1981.  Spautz has been a councillor in Schifflange since 1 January 1994.  He was an échevin from 1 January 2000 until 14 November 2005, when, after the communal elections, the Luxembourg Socialist Workers' Party won an outright majority and the CSV dropped out of coalition.  He was elected to the Chamber of Deputies at the 2004 election, representing the Sud constituency.

Footnotes

External links
 Official website
 Chamber of Deputies official profile

Members of the Chamber of Deputies (Luxembourg)
Members of the Chamber of Deputies (Luxembourg) from Sud
Councillors in Schifflange
Christian Social People's Party politicians
Luxembourgian trade unionists
1963 births
Living people
People from Esch-sur-Alzette